George Burrell may refer to:

 George Burrell (footballer) (1892–?), English footballer
 George Burrell (rugby union) (1921–2001), Scotland rugby union player, referee and administrator
 George Burrell (British Army officer) (1777–1853)
 George Burrell (American football) (born 1948), American football player